The Broadway Building, also known as the Pioneer Park Building, is a building located in downtown Portland, Oregon, that is listed on the National Register of Historic Places.

See also
 National Register of Historic Places listings in Southwest Portland, Oregon

References

External links
 

1913 establishments in Oregon
Buildings and structures completed in 1913
Buildings and structures in Portland, Oregon
Buildings designated early commercial in the National Register of Historic Places
National Register of Historic Places in Portland, Oregon
Southwest Portland, Oregon
Portland Historic Landmarks